Iphigenia is a flowering plant in the family Colchicaceae. It was described by Kunth. It consists of 11 species distributed from tropical Africa, over Madagascar and India to Australia. As with other taxa in Colchicaceae Iphigenia contains phenethylisoquinoline alkaloids including colchicine.

Species

African species
 Iphigenia oliveri Engl.
 Iphigenia pauciflora Martelli

Arabian species
 Iphigenia socotrana Thulin

Indian species
 Iphigenia indica (L.) A.Gray ex Kunth - range extending to China, New Guinea + Australia
 Iphigenia magnifica Ansari & R.S.Rao
 Iphigenia mysorensis Arekal & S.N.Ramaswamy
 Iphigenia pallida Baker
 Iphigenia sahyadrica Ansari & R.S.Rao
 Iphigenia stellata Blatt.

Madagascar species
 Iphigenia boinensis H.Perrier
 Iphigenia robusta Baker

New Zealand species
Iphigenia novae-zelandiae (Hook.f.) Baker

Taxonomy
The genus name of Iphigenia is in reference to Iphigenia, the Greek mythological character, who was a daughter of King Agamemnon and Queen Clytemnestra, and such was a princess of Mycenae.

References

Colchicaceae
Colchicaceae genera